Dibamus dezwaani is a species of legless lizard in the family Dibamidae. The species is endemic to the island of Nias, off Sumatra (Indonesia).

Etymology
The specific name, dezwaani, is in honor of Dutch anthropologist Johannes Pieter Kleiweg de Zwaan.

Habitat
The preferred natural habitat of D. dezwaani is forest.

Description

Reproduction
D. dezwaani is oviparous.

References

Further reading
Das I, Lim KKP (2005). "New species of Dibamus (Squamata: Dibamidae) from Pulau Nias, Indonesia". Journal of Herpetology 39 (1): 113–117. (Dibamus dezwaani, new species).

Dibamus
Reptiles of Indonesia
Endemic fauna of Indonesia
Reptiles described in 2005
Taxa named by Indraneil Das